Garfield is a census-designated place (CDP) in Travis County, Texas, in the United States. As of the 2010 census, the CDP population was 1,698.

Geography
Garfield is located at  (30.196097, −97.551480), 12 miles (19 km) southeast of downtown Austin.

According to the United States Census Bureau in 2000, the CDP has a total area of 13.9 square miles (35.9 km2), of which, 13.7 square miles (35.4 km2) of it is land and 0.2 square miles (0.5 km2) of it (1.44%) is water.

Education
Garfield is served by the Del Valle Independent School District. The Del Valle and Hornsby-Dunlap elementary schools serve portions of the community. For middle school students are divided between Dailey Middle School and Del Valle Middle School. High school students are zoned to Del Valle High School.

The East Travis Gateway Library District operates the Garfield Library.

Demographics
As of the census of 2000, there were 1,660 people, 550 households, and 421 families residing in the CDP. The population density was 121.3 people per square mile (46.9/km2). There were 585 housing units at an average density of 42.7/sq mi (16.5/km2). The racial makeup of the CDP was 73.73% White, 2.35% African American, 0.54% Native American, 1.08% Asian, 19.46% from other races, and 2.83% from two or more races. Hispanic or Latino of any race were 32.17% of the population.

There were 550 households, out of which 37.8% had children under the age of 18 living with them, 55.8% were married couples living together, 14.0% had a female householder with no husband present, and 23.3% were non-families. 15.8% of all households were made up of individuals, and 6.4% had someone living alone who was 65 years of age or older. The average household size was 3.02 and the average family size was 3.36.

In the CDP, the population was spread out, with 30.2% under the age of 18, 9.0% from 18 to 24, 27.8% from 25 to 44, 24.3% from 45 to 64, and 8.7% who were 65 years of age or older. The median age was 33 years. For every 100 females, there were 107.8 males. For every 100 females age 18 and over, there were 111.3 males.

The median income for a household in the CDP was $48,618, and the median income for a family was $53,558. Males had a median income of $30,125 versus $25,074 for females. The per capita income for the CDP was $24,957. About 9.5% of families and 13.4% of the population were below the poverty line, including 21.9% of those under age 18 and 6.3% of those age 65 or over.

Climate
Climate is characterized by relatively high temperatures and evenly distributed precipitation throughout the year.  The Köppen Climate Classification subtype for this climate is "Cfa" (Humid Subtropical Climate).

References

Census-designated places in Texas
Census-designated places in Travis County, Texas
Census-designated places in Greater Austin